Santhal Pargana division constitutes one of the five district administration units known as the divisions of Jharkhand state in eastern India.

Origin of name
Santhal Pargana derives its name from two words: "Santhal", a major inhabited tribe in the region and Pargana, a unit of administration in Persian language used mostly by medieval rulers.

Location
Santhal Pargana is one of the divisions of Jharkhand. Its headquarters is at Dumka. Presently, this administrative division comprises six districts: Godda, Deoghar, Dumka, Jamtara, Sahibganj and Pakur.

History
This region is mentioned as Kajangala in different ancient literatures specially in Buddhist literatures. 
It is mentioned that the Chinese monk-traveller Xuanzang (Hiuen Tsang) travelled from Champa (recent Bhagalpur) to Kajangala and then proceeded to Pundravardhana (recent Bangladesh) in the 7th century AD. He says that the northern limit of its territory (means Sahebganj) was not very far from the Ganges. The forests to the south had plenty of elephants. The people were straight forward, talented and devoted to education.

In the system of Permanent Settlement, British encourage paharia of Rajmahal hills to practice settled agriculture but they refused to cut trees. Then British officials attracted attention to Santals who were ready to clear the forests for settled agriculture. In 1832, a large number of area demarcated as Damin-i-koh. Santal from Cuttack, Dhalbhum, Birbhum, Manbhum, Hazaribagh migrated, clear forest tracts and started cultivating these lands as peasants. British collected tax from Santals as revenue. The imposition of taxes, exploitation by Zamindar and money lenders sparked Santal rebellion. The  Sidhu and Kanhu Murmu, two brothers led the Santals against the Britishers but were defeated.

In 1855, during British India, Santhal Parganas was created as a district, and was a part of the Bengal Presidency. Santhal Parganas was a district, in undivided Bihar state, India. After formation of Jharkhand in became division.

Demographics

Languages

It has a population of 6,969,097.

Religion

References

Divisions of Jharkhand